Daron Clark (born September 21, 1985) is an American football wide receiver who is currently a free agent. He played college football at Stillman College. Clark has played for the Spokane Shock. He was released by the Green Bay Blizzard on April 17, 2014. Clark signed on May 1, 2014 with the Richmond Raiders of the Professional Indoor Football League (PIFL). On October 20, 2015, Clark signed with the Bloomington Edge. Clark signed with the High Country Grizzlies for the 2017 season. On October 9, 2017, Clark signed with the Quad City Steamwheelers.

On October 10, 2020, Clark signed with the Northern Arizona Wranglers of the Indoor Football League (IFL) for the team's inaugural 2021 season. On December 5, 2021, Clark was released by the Wranglers.

On November 29, 2022, Clark signed with the Tulsa Oilers of the Indoor Football League (IFL). On February 24, 2023, Clark was released by the Oilers.

References

Living people
1985 births
American football wide receivers
Stillman Tigers football players
New York Sentinels players
Montreal Alouettes players
Orlando Predators players
San Antonio Talons players
Bloomington Edge players
Spokane Shock players
Colorado Crush (IFL) players
Green Bay Blizzard players
Cleveland Gladiators players
Richmond Raiders players
Iowa Barnstormers players
High Country Grizzlies players
Champions Indoor Football players